Samuel Edward Field (born 8 May 1998) is an English professional footballer who plays as a midfielder or a defensive midfielder for Championship club Queens Park Rangers.

Club career

West Bromwich Albion

Early career
On 7 May 2016, Field was named on West Brom's subs bench for the first time in their game against Bournemouth, having been named in the match day squad the week before against Manchester City. On 15 May 2016, Field then made his debut for West Brom in the Premier League against Liverpool coming on in the 86th minute to replace James McClean in a 1–1 draw. Prior to the match he was named West Brom's Academy Player of the Season. On 29 June 2016, Field signed a one-year deal with West Brom, with a possible 12-month extension in the club's favour, which was Field's first professional contract. He started his first game for West Brom in the EFL Cup against Northampton Town on 23 August 2016 in 4–3 penalty shootout loss after drawing 2–2 in extra time, with Field playing the full 120 minutes. On 28 August 2016, Field started his first Premier League game against Middlesbrough, playing 76 minutes in an eventual 0–0 draw. On 13 October 2016, Field signed a four-year deal with West Brom, contracting him to the club until 2020. On 1 November 2017, Field extended his stay by signing a one-year extension on improved terms, keeping him at the Hawthorns until 2021.

2017–18 season
After the sacking of manager Tony Pulis, Field was given his first start of the season by caretaker manager Gary Megson versus Tottenham in a 1–1 draw at Wembley Stadium on 25 November. Field reprised his role three days later against Newcastle United, scoring his first Premier League goal in a 2–2 draw at the Hawthorns on 28 November.

2019–20 season: Loan to Charlton Athletic
On 8 August 2019, Field and teammate Jonathan Leko joined Charlton Athletic on a season long loan.

2020–21 season: Loan to Queens Park Rangers
On 1 February 2021, Field joined Championship side Queens Park Rangers on loan for the remainder of the season. On 17 February 2021, Field made his QPR debut as a substitute against West London rivals Brentford, and scored to make the score 1–1 before they went on to win 2–1.

Queens Park Rangers

On 20 May 2021, Field signed permanently for Queens Park Rangers on a three-year deal.

International career

English national youth teams
Field was called up to the England national side at youth level for the first time on 17 May 2016 for their two match tour of South Korea in June. He made his debut on 3 June and was sent off in a 2–0 defeat against South Korea U17 after receiving two yellow cards.

In March 2017, Field scored for the England under-19 team against Norway in an elite qualifier for the 2017 UEFA European Under-19 Championship. Field was not released for selection at the subsequent tournament due to club commitments.

Personal life
He is a lifelong West Bromwich Albion fan.

Career statistics

Honours
Individual
West Bromwich Albion Academy Player of the Season: 2015–16

References

External links
England profile at The FA

1998 births
Living people
English footballers
Association football midfielders
West Bromwich Albion F.C. players
Queens Park Rangers F.C. players
Charlton Athletic F.C. players
English Football League players
Premier League players
England youth international footballers